MV Princess II was a ferry owned by the Public Transport Authority and operated under contract by Captain Cook Cruises on Transperth services on the Swan River in Perth, Western Australia.

History
Princess II was built by Hofland Engineering for the Metropolitan Transport Trust. It entered service in October 1973 to replace Valhalla.

References

Ferries of Western Australia
Ships built in Western Australia
1973 ships